Autobiografía del general Franco (1992) (English, Autobiography of general Franco) is a novel by Manuel Vázquez Montalbán. In 1994 it was awarded the international prize Premio Internacional de Literatura Ennio Flaiano.

Translations
The novel has not yet been translated into English. Published translations are:
1994 (French, Bernard Cohen) Moi, Franco
1994 (Italian, Hado Lyria) Io, Franco
1995 (Dutch) Autobiografie van generaal Franco
1996 (Portuguese, Ricardo de Azevedo) Autobiografia do general Franco

External links
Moi, Franco

1992 novels
20th-century Spanish novels
Novels by Manuel Vázquez Montalbán
Biographical novels